Sarv is a village in Ernan Rural District of the Central District of Mehriz County, Yazd province, Iran. At the 2006 National Census, its population was 627 in 205 households. The following census in 2011 counted 431 people in 153 households. The latest census in 2016 showed a population of 451 people in 158 households; it was the largest village in its rural district.

References 

Mehriz County

Populated places in Yazd Province

Populated places in Mehriz County